Zaburunny is a rural locality (a khutor) in Gusyovskoye Rural Settlement, Olkhovsky District, Volgograd Oblast, Russia. The population was 156 as of 2010. There are 3 streets.

Geography 
Zaburunny is located in steppe, on the right bank of the Ilovlya River, 30 km northwest of Olkhovka (the district's administrative centre) by road. Gusyovka is the nearest rural locality.

References 

Rural localities in Olkhovsky District
Tsaritsynsky Uyezd